To the Races is an album by Eric Bachmann, of the bands Crooked Fingers and Archers of Loaf. It was released on August 22, 2006.

It was recorded in a hotel room in North Carolina.

The album is the 95th release of Saddle Creek Records.

Track listing
 "Man O' War"
 "Home"
 "Carrboro Woman"
 "Genivieve"
 "Genie, Genie"
 "Lonesome Warrior"
 "To the Races"
 "Liars and Thieves"
 "Little Bird"
 "So Long, Savannah"

References

External links
Saddle Creek Records

2006 albums
Saddle Creek Records albums